Rosehill is a suburb of Sydney, in the state of New South Wales, Australia. Rosehill is located 18 kilometres west of the Sydney central business district in the local government area of the City of Parramatta and is part of the Greater Western Sydney region.

Rosehill shares the postcode of 2142 with the separate suburbs of Granville, South Granville, Holroyd and Camellia.

Rosehill contains a mixture of residential, commercial, industrial and recreational land, with increased high-density housing proposed.

History 

In the early days of the colony, the hill behind old Government House had been named ‘Rose Hill’ by Governor Arthur Phillip, before the suburb had been named Parramatta.

On 25 March 1789, Henry Dodd took charge of a farm established at Rose Hill. James Ruse came to farm there in November of the same year. In December 1790, a crop of corn (wheat), described as "exceeding good," was harvested at Rose Hill. By 1791, 200 acres of land had been cleared and were in production.

Nearly a hundred years later in 1883,  of John Macarthur's Elizabeth Farm were subdivided for industrial purposes. Part of the estate was set aside for a recreation area, which became Rosehill Racecourse.

A public school opened here in 1886 and the railway station opened in 1888 on the Carlingford railway line, which was privately owned until it was taken over by the state government in 1904 and later closed in January 2020.

Heritage listings 
Rosehill has a number of heritage-listed sites, including:

 60 Prospect Street: Camden
 62 Prospect Street: Comfort Lodge
 70 Alice Street: Elizabeth Farm
 Arthur Street: Elizabeth Farm Reserve

Landmarks 
 Rosehill Gardens Racecourse hosts some of the most important events on the Australian horse racing calendar, including the prestigious Golden Slipper.
 Historic Elizabeth Farm was the home of wool pioneer, John Macarthur
Mercure Sydney Parramatta Hotel, formerly Travelodge Rosehill

Education 
 Rosehill Public School

Population 
At the 2016 census, Rosehill recorded a population of 3,806.  Of these:

 The age distribution was unusual, with a preponderance of younger adults compared to the country in general, but similar to the neighbouring suburb of Silverwater.  The median age was 31 years, compared to the national median of 38 years. There was a large concentration of people between 20 and 34 years of age; they make up 43.5% of residents (national average is 21.1%).  Children aged 0–14 years made up 16.9% of the population (national average is 18.7%) and people aged 65 years and over made up only 4.5% of the population (national average is 15.8%).
  28.6% of people were born in Australia. The next most common countries of birth were India 25.3%, China 6.6%, Lebanon 3.3% and Philippines 2.8%. About three-quarters (74.8%) of residents had both parents born overseas. 25.3% of people only spoke English at home. Other languages spoken at home included Gujarati 9.5%, Arabic 7.6%, Mandarin 7.0%, Hindi 7.0% and Punjabi 4.9%.
 The most common responses for religion were Hinduism 24.0%, Catholic 18.9% and No Religion 16.0%.
 8.4% of the work-force was unemployed, above the national average of 6.9%.
 Almost two-thirds (66.5%) of households were family households and 26.3% were single person households. 71.4% of occupied private residences were flats, units or apartments, 16.7% were separate houses and 9.6% were semi-detached. 62.5% were rented, 23.9% were owned with a mortgage and 9.7% were owned outright.

References

External links 

  

Suburbs of Sydney
City of Parramatta
1789 establishments in Australia